TapClicks is a privately held marketing technology company, with headquarters located in San Jose, California.

TapClicks’ TapAnalytics marketing operations platform is focused on marketing workflow, performance analytics, client reporting and data. The platform's marketing reporting is powered by data science and AI/ML.

TapClicks’ platform is in use by organizations including media companies, digital agencies and enterprises.

Company
TapClicks was founded in 2009 and maintains headquarters in San Jose, California, with development and sales offices in Boston and Montreal.

Partners of TapClicks include MicroStrategy and Tableau Software.

TapClicks has received funding from venture capital/private equity firms Boathouse Capital and SaaS Capital.

In April 2017, TapClicks acquired SEO and marketing reporting company Raven Tools.

In April 2020, TapClicks acquired cross-network advertising startup AdStage.

See also 
 Digital Media
 Web Development

References

External links 
 

Technology companies based in the San Francisco Bay Area
2009 establishments in California